Biharia euroregion is a euroregion located in Romania and Hungary.

Administration
Biharia euroregion is composed of:
Bihor County  in 
Hajdú-Bihar County  in 
The administrative center is Oradea which is the largest city of the euroregion.

Largest cities

Euroregions of Romania
Euroregions of Hungary